Muromtsevo is a rural locality (a settlement) and the administrative center of Muromtsevskoye Rural Settlement, Sudogodsky District, Vladimir Oblast, Russia. The population was 3,019 as of 2010. There are 27 streets.

Geography 
Muromtsevo is located 5 km southeast of Sudogda (the district's administrative centre) by road. Gorki is the nearest rural locality.

References 

Rural localities in Sudogodsky District